Caldo galego or simply caldo (in Galician), also known as caldo gallego (in Spanish), meaning literally “Galician broth”, is a traditional soup dish from Galicia. It is essentially a regional derivative (with added beans and turnip greens) of the very similar caldo verde, the traditional soup dish of neighbouring Portugal.

Ingredients include repolo (cabbage), verzas (collard greens), grelos (rapini), or navizas (sweet turnip greens); potatoes; white beans; and unto (lard). Additionally it can contain fatty pork, chorizo, ham, or bacon (compango).

It is served hot as a starter, often as part of xantar (lunch), and sometimes dinner. Traditionally it was usually served in cuncas (earthen bowls).

Variations
Depending on the availability of seasonal ingredients there are several variations:
Caldo branco includes chickpeas and beans.
Caldo chirlo or vigueiro
Caldo de castañas uses chestnuts

See also
 Cabbage soup
 Caldo verde
 List of soups
 Shchi

References

External links
Video of preparation

Spanish soups and stews
National dishes
Cabbage dishes
Spanish legume dishes
Bean soups